Nagia sacerdotis is a species of moth in the family Erebidae. It is found in Malawi and South Africa.

References

Nagia
Moths described in 1926
Moths of Africa